The Shinjuku–Kabukicho Love Hotel murders is the nickname given to an unsolved series of murders committed in the Shinjuku and Kabukicho areas of Tokyo in 1981. The three victims, all women, were strangled to death in love hotels at night. The murders only stopped after a fourth victim survived.

Murders

Hostess A 

The first victim, known under the pseudonym of Hostess A, was last seen alive checking into room 401 of the New El Sky hotel with a young man on March 19, 1981. A day later, at about 10 a.m., there was no sign of the victim, who was supposed to have checked out of the hotel by that time. That caused an employee then went into her hotel room and found the victim strangled to death. An ID found on her identified her as a local 33-year-old hostess. However, her ID turned out to be fraudulent. She was actually a 45-year-old woman who abandoned her family in 1975 to live in Kabukicho. Authorities speculated that she might have worked as a prostitute prior to her death, and that the murderer may have picked her up from her cabaret job.

Hostess B 

The second victim, known as Hostess B, was strangled to death with her pantyhose on the night of April 25, 1981. About an hour before her body was discovered, she was seen checking into room 203 of the Coca Palace hotel with a man. All of her clothes were missing except for her yukata. The murderer left behind a few insignificant items items of the victim, such as her earrings, sandals, cigarettes, and a lighter.

The victim was estimated to be about 20-years-old and 157 centimeters (5'1) tall. She was also believed to be Taiwanese. Due to the police being unable to identify her, they released a sketch of the victim to the public. However, this led to no results. The authorities believe that she may have lived in a rural area because she had clean lungs and unhealthy teeth.

Shoujo A 

On June 14, 1981, the third victim, known under the alias of Shoujo A, was last seen alive checking into a hotel room at the Higashioka hotel with a man. The man later walked out of the hotel alone and passed two employees on his way out of the building. The witnesses said that the man wore a suit. Because of the recent murders, the employees were suspicious of the man, and checked his hotel room. In the room, they found the victim with her hands and feet tied, and pantyhose wrapped around her neck. When she was found, she was still alive, but later died in the hospital.

The victim was later identified as a 17-year-old girl who lived in Kawaguchi city. During her autopsy, coffee was found in her stomach. This led authorities to believe that she met the murderer in a coffee shop.

Attempted murder 
On June 25, 1981, a 30-year-old hostess in an arcade was invited by a man to a love hotel. After checking in to the hotel at about 11 p.m., the man began to strangle the woman. The woman fought back against her attacker, causing him to steal her wallet and run away.

Similarities between murders 
Police linked all of the murders and the attempted murder to the same unknown suspect due to the similar circumstances of the crimes. In all three murders, a stimulant was detected in the victims. No injection marks were found victims, so it's believed that they ingested the drug orally. It's also unknown whether the victims took the drugs forcefully or consensually. Additionally, the second and third victims were both strangled with their pantyhose, and the strangling method in third and fourth cases are similar.

Suspect 
The suspect was described by witnesses as a young, well-dressed man who is about 160 centimeters (5'2) tall. In the third and fourth incidents, he wore black-rimmed glasses, and had a round-face. Despite being seen by multiple witnesses and the surviving victim, a composite sketch of the murderer was never made.

Aftermath 
After the murders, it became standard practice to install security cameras in love hotels. Additionally, the murders reinforced the perception that Kabukicho was a dangerous place.

In 2016, rumors spread in Japan that a fire broke out at a hotel where one of the victims was murdered, killing a woman in her sixties. The legend also states that two days after the first fire, another fire destroyed the hotel where another victim was murdered. These rumors were proven false after it was discovered that the hotels went out of business before 2016.

See also 
 List of serial killers by country

References 

1981 murders in Asia
Deaths by strangulation
Male serial killers
Serial murders in Japan
Unidentified serial killers
Unsolved murders in Japan
Violence against women in Japan